Baron Catto, of Cairncatto in the County of Aberdeen, is a title in the peerage of the United Kingdom. The only hereditary peerage newly conferred during the reign of King Edward VIII, the barony was created on 24 February 1936 for the businessman, banker and public servant, Sir Thomas Catto, 1st Baronet. He had already been created a baronet, of Peterhead, on 5 July 1921.  the titles are held by his grandson, the third baron, who succeeded his father in 2001.

Barons Catto (1936)
Thomas Sivewright Catto, 1st Baron Catto (1879–1959)
Stephen Gordon Catto, 2nd Baron Catto (1923–2001)
Innes Gordon Catto, 3rd Baron Catto (b. 1950)

The heir presumptive is the present holder's brother the Hon. Alexander Gordon Catto (b. 1952)
The heir presumptive's heir apparent is his son Thomas Innes Gordon Catto (b. 1983)

Line of Succession

  Thomas Sivewright Catto, 1st Baron Catto (18791959)
  Stephen Gordon Catto, 2nd Baron Catto (19232001)
  Innes Gordon Catto, 3rd Baron Catto (born 1950)
 (1) Hon. Alexander Gordon Catto (b. 1952)
 (2) Thomas Innes Gordon Catto (b. 1983)
 (3) Alastair Gordon Catto (b. 1986)
 (4) Hon. James Stuart Gordon Catto (b. 1966)
 (5) Hamish Robert Forrest Catto (b. 1998)
 (6) Jock Stephen Gordon Catto (b. 2001)
 (7) Angus James Gordon Catto (b. 2004)

Arms

References

Kidd, Charles, Williamson, David (editors). Debrett's Peerage and Baronetage (1990 edition). New York: St Martin's Press, 1990.

Baronies in the Peerage of the United Kingdom
Noble titles created in 1936